Collin Verfurth (born March 8, 1996) is an American soccer player who plays as a defender.

College 
Verfurth played NCAA Division I college soccer for Virginia Tech Hokies in the Atlantic Coast Conference (ACC). In 2014 he appeared in 14 games, making 13 starts. In 2015 he played in 16 games with 15 starts including 2 goals and 11 shots on goal for the season. In 2016 Verfurth started 21 games recording 5 points for the season (2 goals & 1 assist). He also scored the game winning goals against Georgetown and Delaware. Later that season he led The Hokies to Elite Eight in NCAA Tournament. In 2017 he started and played 19 games while tallying 8 points for the season (4 goals including 2 game winners). He also scored the opening goal in the Hokies' First Round NCAA Tournament win over Air Force.

Professional 
It was announced on March 8, 2019, that Verfurth had signed with the Loudoun United for his first professional deal and he has played 9 games with Loudoun United as of 7 June 2019. Verfurth scored his first professional point with an assist against the Charlotte Independence in a 3–1 win for Loundoun United. By end of his debut season with United he played in 23 games totaling 1,968 minutes.

Verfurth was loaned to D.C. United and had his debut with the MLS club starting, and playing the entire game, in an international friendly against Real Betis of the Spanish First Division. He also made a full appearance for and international friendly against Marseille.

In January 2020, Verfurth joined USL League One expansion side New England Revolution II ahead of the 2020 season. He was among the first four players signed to the Revolution II. Verfurth started and wore the Captain's armband for 15 games of the 16 games for New England Revolution II, led the USL League One in clearances with 74. Totaled 84.7% passing accuracy, 88 duels and 39 aerial duels while winning over 60% of each, had 23 tackles, 14 interceptions, and 6 blocks. 

On July 6, 2020, Verfurth joined New England's senior side in MLS. He was the first player in club history to ascend from the Revolution II roster to the MLS Club.  His option year was exercised by the Revolution for the 2021 season. Following the 2021 season, Verfurth's contract option was decloined.

Honours
New England Revolution
 Supporters' Shield: 2021

References

External links
Profile at Virginia Tech
Signed by Loudoun United
New England Revolution Roster - VERFURTH, COLLIN

1996 births
Living people
American soccer players
Association football midfielders
Loudoun United FC players
New England Revolution players
New England Revolution II players
People from Ashburn, Virginia
Reading United A.C. players
Soccer players from Virginia
Sportspeople from the Washington metropolitan area
USL Championship players
USL League One players
USL League Two players
Virginia Tech Hokies men's soccer players